Pasi Rantanen (born 30 October 1969, in Helsinki, Finland) is a Finnish singer best known for his power metal band Thunderstone, of which he was a member from the band's creation in 2000 until 2007. He rejoined Thunderstone in 2013 as a full-time member again and provided vocals for the band's comeback album "Apocalypse Again" in 2016.

Rantanen also served as a background singer on, amongst other things, Stratovarius, Kotipelto and Ari Koivunen albums. In addition, the album Raskasta Joulua featured his talents on a version of "White Christmas". Rantanen also appeared at the Eurovision 2006 performance by Lordi as a background singer wearing a mask of Gene Simmons from Kiss. He is currently performing in a band called Joe Doakes, a Finnish cover band and STRIKE, a melodic rock band that he co-founded in 1985.

Discography

References 

1966 births
Living people
20th-century Finnish male singers
Musicians from Helsinki
Thunderstone (band) members
21st-century Finnish male singers